Basilica Therma was a town located of ancient Bithynia, near Prusa.

Its site is located near Çekirge, Asiatic Turkey.

References

Populated places in Bithynia
Former populated places in Turkey